Neal Shusterman (born November 12, 1962) is an American writer of young-adult fiction. He won the 2015 National Book Award for Young People's Literature for his book Challenger Deep and his novel, Scythe, was a 2017  Michael L. Printz Honor book.

Early life
Shusterman was born on November 12, 1962, and raised in Brooklyn, New York City. From a young age, Shusterman was an avid reader. His family is Jewish. At the age of 16, Shusterman and his family moved to Mexico City.
He finished high school there at the American School Foundation and is quoted as saying that "Having an international experience changed my life, giving me a fresh perspective on the world, and a sense of confidence I might not have otherwise." He attended the University of California, Irvine, where he double-majored in psychology and theater, and was also on the varsity swim team.

Career
After college, Shusterman worked as an assistant at the Irvin Arthur Associates, a talent agency in Los Angeles, where Lloyd Segan became his agent. Within a year, Shusterman had his first book deal and a screenwriting job. He lives in Florida.

Shusterman has received numerous honors for his books, including the National Book Award in 2015 for his novel Challenger Deep, the Boston Globe–Horn Book Award, and the 2008 California Young Reader Medal for The Schwa Was Here. He served as a judge for the PEN/Phyllis Naylor Working Writer Fellowship in 2012. His novels Downsiders and Full Tilt have each won over 20 awards. Unwind has won more than 30 awards and is in development with Universal TV as a television series. His novel Scythe is in development with Universal as a feature film.

Shusterman has also written for TV, including the Original Disney Channel movie Pixel Perfect, as well as episodes of Goosebumps and Animorphs. He has written for R. L. Stine's The Haunting Hour: The Series and is also adapting his novel Challenger Deep for 20th Century Fox.

Fellow author Orson Scott Card invited Shusterman to write novels parallel to Ender's Game about other characters from the series, but schedules didn't permit it, and Card wrote Ender's Shadow and the subsequent series himself.

Awards
2005 Boston Globe–Horn Book Award.
2008 California Young Reader Medal for The Schwa Was Here.
2015 National Book Award for Young People's Literature and the Golden Kite Award for Fiction for Challenger Deep.
2017 Micheal L. Printz Award Honour Book for "Scythe".
2019 Young Hoosier Book Award (Middle Grade) for Scythe.

Bibliography

Fiction series

The Accelerati trilogy (with Eric Elfman)
Tesla's Attic (2014) 
Edison's Alley (2015) 
Hawking's Hallway (2016)

Antsy Bonano
The Schwa Was Here (2004) 
Antsy Does Time (2008) 
Ship Out of Luck (2013)

Arc of a Scythe

Scythe (2016)
Thunderhead (2018)
The Toll (2019)
Gleanings: Stories from the Arc of a Scythe (2022)

Dark Fusion
Dread Locks (2005)
Red Rider's Hood (2005)
Duckling Ugly (2006)

Shadow Club
The Shadow Club (1988)
The Shadow Club Rising (2002)

Skinjacker trilogy
Everlost (2006)
Everwild (2009)
Everfound (2011)

Star Shards
Scorpion Shards (1995)
Thief of Souls (1999)
Shattered Sky (2002)

The Unwind dystology
Unwind (2007) 
UnStrung (2012) (short story) 
UnWholly (2012)
UnSouled (2013) 
UnDivided (2014) 
UnBound (2015) (short story collection, contains UnStrung)

The X-Files 
The X-Files Young Adult Series
3) Bad Sign (1997) [writing as Easton Royce] novelization of The X-Files episode Syzygy
10) Dark Matter (1999) [writing as Easton Royce] novelization of The X-Files episode Soft Light
The X-Files Young Readers Series
8) Voltage (1996) [writing as Easton Royce] novelization of The X-Files episode D.P.O.
9) E.B.E. (1996) co-authored with Les Martin [writing as Easton Royce] novelization of The X-Files episode E.B.E.

Space: Above and Beyond
1) The Aliens Approach (1996) [writing as Easton Royce] novelization of the pilot episode of the Space: Above and Beyond TV series
3) Mutiny (1996) [writing as Easton Royce] novelization of the Space: Above and Beyond episode, Mutiny

Novels
Dissidents (1989)
Speeding Bullet (1991)
What Daddy Did (1991) (later renamed Chasing Forgiveness)
The Eyes of Kid Midas (1992)
The Dark Side of Nowhere (1997) 
Downsiders (1999)
Full Tilt (2004) 
Bruiser (2010) 

Challenger Deep (2015) illustrated by Brendon Shusterman 
Dry (2018) co-authored with Jarrod Shusterman 
Game Changer (February 2021)
Roxy (November 2021)

Picture books
Piggyback Ninja (1994) Illustrated by Joe Boddy

Short stories
Resurrection Bay (2013)  [published only as an ebook]

Short story collections
Darkness Creeping: Tales to Trouble Your Sleep (1993)
Darkness Creeping II: More Tales to Trouble Your Sleep (1995)
Mindquakes: Stories to Shatter Your Brain (1996)
Mindstorms: Stories to Blow Your Mind (1996)
Mindtwisters: Stories To Shred Your Head (1997)
Mindbenders: Stories to Warp Your Brain (2000)
Darkness Creeping: Twenty Twisted Tales (2007)
Violent Ends (2015) co-authored with 17 other authors including, Brendon Shusterman, Shaun David Hutchinson, and Beth Revis

Games
How to Host a Murder: Roman Ruins (1997)
How to Host a Murder: The Grapes of Frath (1997)
How to Host a Teen Mystery: Hot Times at Hollywood High (1997)
How to Host a Murder: The Good, the Bad, and the Guilty (1998)
How to Host a Murder: Tragical Mystery Tour (1999)
How to Host a Teen Mystery: Barbecue with the Vampire (1999)
How to Host a Murder: Saturday Night Cleaver (2000)
How to Host a Murder: Maiming of the Shrew (2001)
How to Host a Teen Mystery: Roswell That Ends Well (2002)
How to Host a Murder: An Affair to Dismember (2003)

Nonfiction
Guy Talk (1987)
It's Ok to Say No to Cigarettes and Alcohol (1988)
Neon Angel: The Cherie Currie Story (1989) with Cherie Currie
Kid Heroes: True Stories of Rescuers, Survivors, and Achievers (1991)

Poems
"Shadows of Doubt" (1993)

Screenwriting credits

Television
Goosebumps (1996-1998)
Animorphs (1998)
The Haunting Hour: The Series (2011)

Film
Double Dragon (1994)
Pixel Perfect (2004)

References

External links 

 
Shusterman at Facebook
Shusterman at Twitter
Shusterman at Instagram

 

1962 births
20th-century American novelists
21st-century American novelists
American children's writers
20th-century American Jews
American male novelists
American male screenwriters
Living people
Writers from Brooklyn
American writers of young adult literature
National Book Award winners
20th-century American male writers
21st-century American male writers
Novelists from New York (state)
Screenwriters from New York (state)
21st-century American Jews